Åge Konradsen (born 28 September 1954 in Lenvik) is a Norwegian politician for the Conservative Party.

He was elected to the Norwegian Parliament from Troms in 2001, but was not re-elected in 2005. He had previously served as a deputy representative during the term 1997–2001.

Konradsen was a member of Lenvik municipality council from 1991 to 2001, serving as mayor since 1995. He became leader of the county party chapter in 1993.

Outside politics he worked as a primary school teacher and bureaucrat.

References

1954 births
Living people
Mayors of places in Troms
Members of the Storting
Conservative Party (Norway) politicians
21st-century Norwegian politicians
People from Lenvik